is a Japanese voice actress and former model. Her best-known role is voicing Hazuki Fujiwara in the Ojamajo Doremi series, and Suzume Mizuno in Zatch Bell.

Career

Prior to voice acting, Akiya had been a model.

Filmography

Anime
Ojamajo Doremi – Hazuki Fujiwara
Zatch Bell! – Suzume Mizuno
Penguin Musume Heart – Riff
Demashita! Powerpuff Girls Z – Miss Keane
Casshern Sins – Sophita
Dream Eater Merry – Yui Kounagi

Video games
Zatch Bell! series – Suzume Mizuno
Paper Mario: The Origami King – Olivia

References

External links

1976 births
Living people
Voice actresses from Chiba Prefecture
Japanese voice actresses